Cloud Cruiser is a cloud-based financial management company based in Silicon Valley. Founded in January 2015 by David Zabrowski and Gregory Howard, Cloud Cruiser has offices in Roseville, California, San Jose, California, and the Netherlands.

History
Cloud Cruiser was founded in January 2010 by David Zabrowski and Gregory Howard. Zabrowski was the general manager of Hewlett-Packard company. He also became CEO of Neterion in 2002 and was Entrepreneur in Residence at Wavepoint Ventures. Howard was a software developer and then the development director for CIMS Lab. He also worked for IBM Corporation and the Computer Task Group.

Cloud Cruiser partnered with companies such as HP, Microsoft, VMware, Amazon Marketplace, and Cisco. In July 2010, Wavepoint Ventures led Cloud Cruiser's first round of funding. It included investments from Roger Akers of Akers Capital and other San Francisco Bay Area angel investors. In March 2011, Cloud Cruiser came out of stealth mode and released its eponymous software later that year.

In June 2012, the company raised an additional $6 million in series B funding, led by ONSET Ventures. In 2013, Cloud Cruiser became available for Windows Server 2012 R2 through Microsoft Azure.

In February 2014, the company's software was made available to OpenStack users through Rackspace. Cloud Cruiser started offering OpenStack integration in 2011. In October 2014, Cloud Cruiser 4 was released.
In 2017, Hewlett Packard Enterprise acquired the company.

See also
Cloud computing
Financial management

References

External links
Internal HPE site

Companies based in San Jose, California
Companies based in Roseville, California
Software companies established in 2010
Cloud computing providers
Financial software companies
Hewlett-Packard acquisitions
2017 mergers and acquisitions
Software companies of the United States